Pont-Évêque is a commune in the Isère department in southeastern France.

Population

Twin towns
Pont-Évêque is twinned with:

  Glynneath, Wales, since 1993
  Imbersago, Italy, since 2003

See also
Communes of the Isère department

References

Communes of Isère
Isère communes articles needing translation from French Wikipedia